Surgat is a minor demon mentioned in The Grimoire of Pope Honorius, The Secrets of Solomon and the Grimorium Verum. He is listed as "Surgat who opens all locks." His angel opposite is Aquiel.

In fiction 

In Harlan Ellison's 1981 short story "Grail", Surgat is an important character, unlocking some of the barriers in the protagonist's path but at a terrible price.

He is also a character or mentioned in:

I Have No Mouth, and I Must Scream (1995) (video game)
	
Death from a Top Hat (1938) - Clayton Rawson

Doomed Lensmen (1967) - Sybly White (Lee Gold)

Bird Box (film) - (2018)

 Insidious: The Last Key (film) - (2018)
 Anything for Jackson (film) - (2020)

See also
 Christian demons in popular culture

References

External links
Conjuration in The Book of Ceremonial Magic at Internet Sacred Text Archive

Goetic demons